Pelochrista disquei is a species of moth of the family Tortricidae. It is found in China and Mongolia.

References

Moths described in 1901
Eucosmini